Pembroke railway station serves the town of Pembroke, Pembrokeshire, Wales.

History

On 30 July 1863, Pembroke railway station was opened by the Pembroke and Tenby Railway as the temporary terminus of the line to Tenby. The station originally consisted of small wooden buildings, with a short 150-foot platform. The following year, the line was extended to Pembroke Dock railway station.

A permanent station building was constructed later, built from dressed limestone with a slate roof and three ornamental chimneys. The building contained five rooms; the Station Master's office, a parcels office, a booking office, a general waiting room and a ladies waiting room. Fully glazed canopies were added over the station entrance and platform in the early 1900s, following the takeover of the Pembroke and Tenby by the Great Western Railway. A new shelter was built in 1971, and the main limestone buildings were demolished. This new shelter was in turn was later replaced with a glass panelled shelter.

Facilities
Step-free access is provided from both station car parks to the platform. The station is unstaffed and only has basic amenities: the aforementioned waiting shelter, timetable information posters, bench seating and digital CIS displays to offer train running information in real time.

Like many stations in Wales and the North of England, the station was constructed before standard platform heights were established and is very low. In March 2016, the station received a specially designed raised section - a Harrington Hump - to improve accessibility for passengers.

Services

The station is served every two hours (approximately) to/from Swansea via  and Whitland on weekdays, with connections for the South Wales mainline available at Swansea. The Sunday service is limited in winter (4 trains each way), but more frequent in the summer months.

On summer Saturdays, the station is also used by Great Western Railway who provided two InterCity 125s in each direction; two to London Paddington, one from London Paddington and one early morning InterCity 125 starting its journey from Swansea. One through train in each direction is named the Pembroke Coast Express. In 2019, the service has continued running with the brand new Class 800 rolling stock.

References

External links 

Railway stations in Pembrokeshire
DfT Category F1 stations
Former Great Western Railway stations
Railway stations in Great Britain opened in 1863
Railway stations served by Transport for Wales Rail
Railway station
Railway stations served by Great Western Railway